Thanksgiving after Communion is a spiritual practice among Christians who believe in the Real Presence of Jesus Christ in the  Communion bread, maintaining themselves in prayer for some time to thank God and especially listening in their hearts for guidance from their Divine guest. This practice was and is highly recommended by saints, theologians, and Doctors of the Church.

Basis of the practice

In John 6:51, Jesus is quoted as saying, "I am the living bread that came down from heaven; whoever eats this bread will live forever; and the bread that I will give is my flesh for the life of the world." According to Catholic doctrine, bread is transubstantiated into the "Body and Blood, Soul and Divinity of Jesus Christ." The same holds true for the wine, which in Catholic doctrine is also "the Body, Blood, Soul, and Divinity of Jesus Christ".

Pope John-Paul II in Inaestimabile Donum (Instruction Concerning Worship of the Eucharistic Mystery) emphasized the importance of adoration and prayer after Holy Communion. 

Reverence is that virtue which inclines a person to show honor and respect to God. According to Francis Cardinal Arinze, prefect of the Congregation for Divine Worship and the Discipline of the Sacraments, <blockquote>Thanksgiving after Mass has traditionally been greatly esteemed in the Church for both the priest and the lay faithful. The missal and the breviary even suggest prayers for the priest before and after the Eucharistic celebration. There is no reason to believe that this is no longer needed. Indeed in our noisy world of today, such moments of reflective and loving prayers would seem indicated more than even before.

Pope Benedict XVI  in Sacramentum Caritatis referred to the "precious time of thanksgiving after communion," urging everyone to preserve the importance of Communion as  "a personal encounter with the Lord Jesus in the sacrament." He recommended that during this time "it can also be most helpful to remain recollected in silence."

Practice of the saints
St. Thomas Aquinas (+1274) composed a Prayer of Thanksgiving after Communion that became a classic:<blockquote>I thank You, O holy Lord, almighty Father, eternal God, who have deigned, not through any merits of mine, but out of the condescension of Your goodness, to satisfy me a sinner, Your unworthy servant, with the precious Body and Blood of Your Son, our Lord Jesus Christ. I pray that this Holy Communion be not a condemnation to punishment for me, but a saving plea to forgiveness. May it be to me the armor of faith and the shield of a good will. May it be the emptying out of my vices and the extinction of all lustful desires; and increase of charity and patience, of humility and obedience, and all virtues; a strong defense against the snares of all my enemies, visible and invisible; the perfect quieting of all my evil impulses of flesh and spirit, binding me firmly to You, the one true God; and a happy ending of my life. I pray too that You will deign to bring me, a sinner, to that ineffable banquet where You with Your Son and the Holy Spirit, are to your Saints true light, fulfillment of desires, eternal joy, unalloyed gladness, and perfect bliss. Through the same Christ our Lord. Amen.

After receiving Communion, many of the saints would spend an extended time of thanksgiving. Magdalena de Pazzi wrote, "The minutes that follow Communion are the most precious we have in our lives." St. Teresa of Ávila urged her daughters not to rush out after Mass but to treasure the opportunity for thanksgiving: "Let us detain ourselves lovingly with Jesus," she said, "and not waste the hour that follows Communion." St. Louis de Montfort wrote, "I would not give up this hour of Thanksgiving even for an hour of Paradise."
 
Philip Neri once sent two acolytes with candles to accompany a member of his congregation who had left the church without any adoration after Mass. The man returned to the church to find out St. Philip's purpose. The Saint answered, "We have to pay proper respect to Our Lord, Whom you are carrying away with you. Since you neglect to adore Him, I sent two acolytes to take your place."

Length of time

According to the Baltimore Catechism, Roman Catholics "should spend sufficient time in Thanksgiving after Holy Communion to show due reverence to the Blessed Sacrament; for Our Lord is personally with us as long as the appearance of bread and wine remains."

Through the years, the saints have varied in their recommendation as regards the amount of time to be spent in thanksgiving. Daily Communion only became the practice after a decree of Pope Pius X in 1905. A number of saints referred to an hour of thanksgiving. St. Alphonsus specifically advises everyone to devote at least half an hour to it, if it is at all possible. "There is no prayer more agreeable to God, or more profitable to the soul," said another Doctor of the Church, St. Alphonsus Liguori, "than that which is made during the thanksgiving after Communion."

St. Josemaría Escrivá said: "Surely you have nothing so important on that you cannot give Our Lord 10 minutes to say thanks. Love is repaid with love."

Prayer during thanksgiving
According to Daniel A. Lord, SJ, thanksgiving after Holy Communion always supposes a "realization of who is present in our hearts: Jesus Christ, God-man, lover of souls, divinely powerful, humanly tender, with grace in His hands and the keenest possible interest in His heart for the one who has just received Him." Traditional post-communion prayers include the Adoro te by Thomas Aquinas, the Anima Christi, the Prayer Before a Crucifix, and the Prayer of Saint Francis.

Catholic
According to Fr. Carlos Belmonte, author of Understanding the Mass,The content of our thanksgiving will be just a continuation of the sentiments and affections we have felt – or tried to foster in ourselves – during the Mass, but perhaps in an atmosphere of greater intimacy this time. Sometimes, acts of faith, hope, and charity addressed to the three divine Persons will spurt from our soul. At other times, we will maintain an intimate dialogue with Jesus, our divine Friend who will purify and transform us. Or perhaps, we will just be sitting still, in silent adoration, in the same manner that a mother watches over her son who has fallen asleep. We should not look for prayers or formulas, if we do not find any need for them. But if we realize they can help us, we should overcome our laziness (say, to open our missal and read the prayers for thanksgiving there), or that subtle kind of vanity which makes us feel humiliated by having to read prayers composed by somebody else."

One of the recommended texts for thanksgiving in My Daily Psalm Book (1947), arranged by Joseph Frey, CSSP,  is the Canticle of the Three Young men, or Trium Puerorum. This is a traditional canticle that is included in the prayers for thanksgiving in the Roman Missal of 1962.

There is also the "Universal Prayer" attributed to Pope Clement XI, which begins: "Lord, I believe in you: increase my faith. I trust in you: strengthen my trust. I love you: let me love you more and more. I am sorry for my sins: deepen my sorrow."

Anglican

In the Anglican Communion and in the Catholic Personal Ordinariates, the following post-communion prayer, or a variant of it, is said:

In many Anglican Churches since the 1980s, the following has been a common post-communion prayer:

Lutheran
Among Lutheran denominations, the following prayer may be said silently following the reception of the Eucharist:

Eastern Orthodox
In the Eastern Orthodox Church there are various sets of prayers recommended both for Preparation for Communion and for Thanksgiving After Communion. The specific form will differ depending upon national jurisdiction. However, the thanksgiving rite is more uniformally accepted across jurisdictions than the preparation rite.

Through the centuries, several prayers have been composed for this. Symeon Metaphrastes (probably 10th century) who is venerated by the Eastern Orthodox Church as a saint, and who is known for his Byzantine hagiography, composed the following Prayer of Thanksgiving after Communion which is found in the Hieratikon, or prayers for the priest.

O Thou who didst gladly give me Thy flesh for nourishment; who art fire to consume the unworthy: Burn me not, O my Creator, but search out my members. Quicken my reins and my heart. Let Thy flames devour the thorns of all my transgressions. Purify my soul. Sanctify my thoughts. Knit firm my bones. Enlighten my senses. Piece me with Thy fear. Be Thou my continual shield. Watch over and preserve me from every word and deed that corrupt the soul. Purge me and wash me clean and adorn me. Order my ways, give me understanding and enlighten me. Make me the temple of Thy Holy Ghost, and no more the habitation of sin, that as from fire all evil, every passion, may flee from me, who through Holy Communion am become a place for Thy dwelling. I bring unto Thee all the saints to make intercession: The ranks of the heavenly hosts; Thy forerunner; the wise Apostles; and withal Thy pure and holy Mother. Their prayers receive, O merciful Christ, and make Thy servant a child of light. For Thou art our hallowing, Thou only art the brightness of our souls, O gracious Lord: And we rightly give glory to Thee, our Lord and our God, All the days of our life. Amen.

In the Russian Orthodox Church there are usually a set of five prayers that are recited after the conclusion of the Divine Liturgy. After the dismissal of the Liturgy, those who have received Holy Communion will remain behind and pray as the prayers are recited by a Reader. The priest and other celebrating clergy will usually say the Prayers of Thanksgiving immediately after receiving Holy Communion. However, the deacon who will perform the ablutions will wait to say them after he has finished his duties at the Table of Oblation.

Among the prayers said is one by Saint Basil the Great:
O Master Christ God, King of the ages and Creator of all things, I thank Thee for all the good things which Thou hast bestowed upon me, and for the communion of Thy most pure and life-creating Mysteries. I pray Thee, therefore, O Good One and Lover of mankind: Keep me under Thy protection and in the shadow of Thy wings; and grant me, even until my last breath, to partake worthily and with a pure conscience, of Thy Holy Things, unto the remission of sins and life eternal. For Thou art the Bread of life, the Source of holiness, the Giver of good things; and unto Thee do we send up glory, together with the Father and the Holy Spirit, now and ever, and unto the ages of ages. Amen.

The prayers usually end with the Nunc Dimittis and the Troparion and Kontakion of the saint who wrote the Liturgy that was celebrated (John Chrysostom, Basil the Great, Gregory Dialogist or, rarely, James the Brother of the Lord). Then the rite ends with a dismissal pronounced by the priest.

After the Prayers of Thanksgiving, the communicant should spend the rest of the day in a spirit of thanksgiving, engaging only in activities which are of benefit to the soul. If it is a Sunday or Holy Day he should rest from labour.

See also
 Anima Christi
 Eucharistic discipline
 Prayer Before a Crucifix
 Prayer of Saint Francis

References

External links
 Prayers After Holy Communion, Catholic Tradition
 Latin prayers of the Roman Missal
 Graces from the Holy Eucharist - taken from My Catholic Faith by Bishop Louis LaRavoire Morrow
 The Maronites Monks on Thanksgiving after Communion - a comprehensive article which includes answers to difficulties
 "Prayers of Thanksgiving After Receiving Holy Communion", Assembly of Canonical Orthodox Bishops of the USA
 Prayers After Communion, Church of England
 Prayer after Holy Communion, Galway Redemptorists
Always Thanksgiving To God BIBLE VERSES

Eucharist in the Catholic Church
Eucharistic devotions
Catholic devotions
Roman Catholic prayers
Catholic spirituality